The Palatine Wine Queen, sometimes also called the Palatinate Wine Queen, is the annually elected representative of the Palatine wine region, one of currently 13 recognized wine regions in Germany. She is eligible to participate, the following year, in the competition for the German Wine Queen.

History 
In 1931 the Palatinate region of Germany nominated a wine queen in the town of Neustadt an der Weinstraße at the initiative of the publisher, Daniel Meininger, becoming the first of the German wine-growing regions to do so. The first wine queen was Ruth Bachrodt of Pirmasens in the Southwest Palatinate. This part of the Palatinate has no vineyards and Bachrodt owed her election to the fact that the organizers felt she was the prettiest girl in the audience in the festival hall (the Saalbau in Neustadt) and the judges upheld their proposal. The  candidate had previously been asked the question, "What does a wine queen in all circumstances?" Bachrodt had replied, "you definitely need a pair of good shoes, so you can work in the vineyard." With that she also impressed the Pirmasens shoe manufacturer, Daniel Theysohn, and they were married in 1938.

Because the Palatine Wine Queen in Germany was the only wine queen for many years, she also represented German wine as a whole until 1939 and then again from 1947 to 1949 without needing to go through any further competition. In 1949, too, there was only one competition, but subsequently Elisabeth Kuhn, later Gies from Diedesfeld officially became the German Wine Queen and was thus the only person to hold the titles of Palatine Wine Queen and German Wine Queen in the same year.

Competition process 
The election of the Palatine Wine Queen traditionally takes place during the German Wine Festival, in the Saalbau in the town of Neustadt an der Weinstraße, on the Friday of the first weekend of the festival at the end of September or early October. After her year in office the Palatine Wine Queen, together with the  wine queens of the other twelve German wine regions, takes part in the competition to choose the German Wine Queen. In two years, the outgoing Palatine Wine Queen has been chosen as the German Wine Queen: 
Sylvia Benzinger in 2005 and Katja Schweder in 2006.

List of Palatine wine queens 

The following list shows all Palatine Wine Queens since the competition began in 1931:

German Wine Queens from the Palatinate 

To date the following representatives from the Palatine wine region have been crowned as German Wine Queen:

References

External links 
 Website of the current Palatine Wine Queen
 List of all Palatine Wine Queens since 1931

!